Corbett may refer to:

 Corbett, Oregon, a community in the United States
 Corbett Award, US award for athletics administrators
 Corbett (surname), people with the surname Corbett
 Corbett family, a family named Corbett
 Corbett Price (born 1950/1951), an American political donor and health care business and financial consultant

See also
 
 Corbet, the old English or Anglo-Norman spellings of Corbett or Corbeau
 Corbet (surname)
 Courbet (disambiguation)